Derrick Tremayne Hoskins (born November 14, 1970) is a former professional American football safety in the National Football League. He played five seasons for the Los Angeles/Oakland Raiders (1992–1995) and the New Orleans Saints (1996).

1970 births
Living people
Sportspeople from Meridian, Mississippi
Players of American football from Mississippi
American football safeties
Southern Miss Golden Eagles football players
Los Angeles Raiders players
Oakland Raiders players
New Orleans Saints players